Guzmania remediosensis is a plant species in the genus Guzmania. This species is endemic to Bolivia.

References

remediosensis
Flora of Bolivia